Savkin is a Russian masculine surname, its feminine counterpart is Savkina. Notable people with the surname include:

Larisa Savkina (born 1955), Soviet handball player

Russian-language surnames